Sang-e Zur (also Romanized as Sang-e Zūr; also known as Sang-e Zūr-e Qaţārbaneh) is a village in Qatruyeh Rural District, Qatruyeh District, Neyriz County, Fars Province, Iran. At the 2006 census, its population was 191, in 50 families.

References 

Populated places in Neyriz County